The Kortenaer class was a class of anti-submarine frigates of the Royal Netherlands Navy. Like other frigate types of the 1970s and 1980s, they featured a COGOG (combined gas or gas) propulsion system with separate cruise and sprint gas turbines. Ten were built by De Schelde in Vlissingen and two by Wilton-Fijenoord in Schiedam between 1978 and 1982. Only ten served with the Royal Netherlands Navy: two were sold to Greece's Navy while still under construction and replaced by two  frigates which were an air defence variant of the Kortenaer class. After service with the Dutch ended, eight of the frigates were sold to Greece in 1992 and the remaining two to the United Arab Emirates. Three of the ships have since been retired from active military service with one converted into the superyacht .

Background
The Kortenaer class was designed as an anti-submarine warfare (ASW) frigate intended to replace the two ASW classes ( and es) already in service with the Royal Netherlands Navy. The Dutch planning committee intended for the class to have the maximum number of NATO compatible systems to other NATO frigate classes, even offering to enter in agreements with other navies, such as the British Royal Navy. These offers were rejected and instead the Dutch designed a standard platform, later referred to as the "Standard design", that would allow for ASW and anti-aircraft warfare (AAW) variants, while conforming to NATO standards.

Design and description
The design's hull form was similar to contemporary French designs with continuous upper and main decks, a single rudder and a clipper bow. The frigates were designed to operate smoothly in seaways with reduced length-to-beam ratio than usual for ships of their size. Furthermore, the ships would have a higher degree of automation to reduce the engine room complement requirement and overall crew size, with the frigates being able to be operated and fought from the operations room. With varying gun and radar compositions of the ships over their careers, the displacement would later differ among the class. Due to the high amount of automation within the ship, the complement was reduced from 196 to 176 officers and sailors.

The Kortenaer class sported 15 watertight bulkheads. The vessels were powered by a combined gas or gas (COGOG) system incorporating two Rolls-Royce Tyne RM1C gas turbines creating  each and Rolls-Royce Olympus TM3B gas turbines creating  each. Electricity was provided by four SEMT-Pielstick PA4 750 kW diesel generators. The vessels also had redundancy in their design, being equipped with two auxiliary boilers and evaporators. The engineering plant was spread over four compartments. Moving forward to aft the plant was situated as follows; auxiliaries, Olympus turbines, Tyne turbines and reduction gear, and auxiliaries. To increase stability, the vessels mounted a pair of Denny–Brown fin stabilizers.

The design originally called for the installation of two OTO Melara /62 calibre naval guns in single mounts, with one placed forward and one mounted atop the hangar aft. However, after the first four ships, the aft 76 mm gun was swapped out for a Bofors /L70 calibre anti-aircraft (AA) gun.

Each of the vessels were mounted with two quad launchers for Harpoon anti-ship missiles, each missile was capable of travelling  at Mach 0.9 carrying a  warhead. They were also armed with a Mark 29 octuple launcher for the Sea Sparrow AA missile and could carry up to 24 missiles.

The Kortenaer class was initially equipped with a Knebworth/Corvus rocket-launched chaff system, replaced by SRBOC six-tubed chaff launchers. They sported an ESM/ECM Ramses jammer and a SEWACO II action data system. They utilised LW 08 air search radar operating on the D band, ZW 06 surface search radar operating on the I band and STIR and WM 25 fire control radars operating on the I/J bands. For ASW purposes, the frigates had bow-mounted SQS-505, SQS-509 sonar or SQR-19 TACTASS towed sonar. The Kortenaer class had a flight deck and hangar at the stern of the ship that was initially capable of operating up to two Westland SH-14B Lynx helicopters, but normally carried only one during peacetime operations.

Construction and service
The Dutch Government ordered the first batch of four ships on 31 August 1974. This was followed by a second batch of four on 28 November 1974 and a third batch of four on 29 December 1976. The first eight ships were all constructed by Royal Schelde. The ninth and tenth ships were built by Wilton-Fijenoord, and the final two ships were constructed by Royal Schelde. A contract was signed on 15 September 1980 with Greece for the sale of one the hulls under construction and the option for one more, which was taken up on 7 June 1981. These turned into hulls six and seven of the second batch (Peter Florisz and Witte de With). The remaining Kortenaer-class ships were initially used to patrol areas of the Atlantic Ocean until the 1990s, when their operations were shifted to the Mediterranean Sea and Strait of Hormuz. This was highlighted by NATO deployments in support of blockade operations during the Yugoslav Wars and operations in the Strait of Hormuz and Persian Gulf during the Gulf War. In 1993, Bloys van Treslong was sent west to the Caribbean Sea to enforce a United Nations blockade of Haiti. In 2001, the Kortenaers saw one last mission in Dutch service, with Philips van Almonde deploying to the Persian Gulf as part of Operation Enduring Freedom. However, budget cuts to the military began and forced the early retirement of the class from Dutch service.

On 9 November 1992, Greece signed an agreement to acquire more ships of the class, with the initial group totalling three. Banckert, Callenburgh and Van Kinsbergen were the first three to be sold. This was followed by Kortenaer, the second Peter Florisz, Jan van Brakel, Philips van Almonde and Bloys van Treslong. The remaining two frigates were transferred to the United Arab Emirates in a contract signed on 2 April 1996 following a refit at Royal Schelde.

Ships in the class
The ships were named after Dutch captains and admirals:

Export

Greece

The first two frigates were acquired in 1980 and entered service with the Hellenic Navy in 1981 and 1892. Named Elli and Limnos construction of a third ship, to be built in Greece, was cancelled. On the initial Greek ships, the 40 mm gun was never installed and instead of the Goalkeeper CIWS, two American Phalanx Mk 15  CIWS were installed instead, to either side of the aft 76 mm gun. Furthermore, the Hellenic Navy did not operate Lynx helicopters so the hangar was extended  to accommodate two Agusta-Bell AB 212ASW helicopters. From 1993 to 1997 four more Kortenaer-class frigates entered service with the Hellenic Navy and underwent the same modifications as Elli and Limnos with the exception of the lengthened hangars. From 2001 to 2003, the final four ships entered Greek service and were also modified like the others taken over from Dutch service. Six of the ships underwent an electronics refit from 2003 to 2006. The first of the Greek frigates was taken out of service in 2013.

Iran
The Imperial Iranian Navy was preparing to place an order with Royal Schelde but all military contracts were cancelled after the Iranian Revolution.

United Arab Emirates
Two ships were transferred to the United Arab Emirates military, entering service as Abu Dhabi and Al Emirat in December 1997 and May 1998 respectively. Based at Jebel Ali, the two frigates had additional air conditioning fitted, a new surface search radar (Signaal Scout using the I band) and operated two Eurocopter AS565 Panther helicopters. There were plans to convert Abu Dhabi into a superyacht as well.

See also
 
 MEKO 140
 MEKO 360

Citations

Bibliography

Further reading

External links

Frigate classes
Frigates of the Royal Netherlands Navy
Kortenaer-class frigates